Oecobius navus is a small cosmopolitan cribellate spider species found across the world.

Description 
Both adult males and females are approximately the same size, with a body length of 2–2.5 mm (0.08 – 0.10 in). The carapace is almost circular, pale brown, with a dark patch in the centre which sometimes extends to the ocular region, and a thin black marginal line. The abdomen is coloured a yellowish brown, with black spots over smaller white flecking. Their posterior spinnerets are long, with a tubule between them. The legs are short, and coloured as the carapace; they vary from being unmarked to having distinct, dark annulations. They have eight eyes, however the posterior median eyes are reduced to being flat, irregular silver patches. The other six eyes are grouped into two pairs of three.

Distribution and habitat 
Oecobius navus is native to Europe and Northern Africa, however it has also been introduced to South Africa, China, Korea, Japan, New Zealand, and the Americas. It builds flat webs with lateral openings with a diameter of about 3 cm under rocks, on ceilings and along the corners of walls with protruding signaling threads.

Behaviour

Hunting 
As with other Oecobiids, O. navus have an unusual hunting method; they run around their prey, using the anal tubule and spinnerets to coat it in ribbons of sticky silk. Once their prey is fully trapped in the silk, the spider bites it.

Reproduction 
Prior to copulation, the male constructs a tubular mating web above the female's retreat. He then attempts to entice the female inside; if she joins him inside, they mate. As with many spider species, the female may cannibalize the male during or after copulation. The female spins several small egg sacs, each containing 3–10 eggs, and abandons them.

Taxonomy 
Although this species is sometimes called O. annulipes, there is also a species of that name that only occurs in Algeria. Common names for these spiders are wall spider, baseboard spider and stucco spider.

Citations

External links
 Picture and description of O. navus

Oecobiidae
Cosmopolitan spiders
Spiders described in 1859